Thomas Arundell (died 1648) was an English politician who sat in the House of Commons  from 1640 to 1648.

Arundell was the son of John Arundell of Trerice, Cornwall, and his wife Gertrude Dennys, daughter of Sir Robert Dennys of Holcombe. He inherited property at Duloe from his father and extended it by further additions. On 30 May 1614, he was granted all that parcel, quantity of ground, oze, or water, now surrounded by the said millpool-wall, to hold for 500 years, and afterwards built a millhouse, the mill-pool-wall, four grist-mills, and other houses.

In his 'Survey of Cornwall' Richard Carew (Arundell's brother in law) reveals that he was a soldier; "(he) followeth the Netherland wars, with so well-liked a carriage, that he outgoeth his age, and time of service, in preferment."

In November 1640, Arundell was elected Member of Parliament for West Looe in the Long Parliament. Unlike his Royalist cousins he remained in parliament until his death in 1648.

Marriage and issue
Arundell married Mary Capell, daughter of Sir Gamaliel Capell 
 Gertrude Arundell 
Mary (Marie) died on 8 May 1623 and was buried at Newlyn East. Their daughter Gertrude is named in Thomas' will as Gartred (sic) Meech widow.

His second wife (married 21 June 1624 at Morwenstow in Cornwall) was Julian Cary the daughter of George Cary Esq and Catherine (nee Russell) of Clovelly in Devon. They had issue including a son John who succeeded his father at Duloe  and a son Francis.

Arundell made his will on 3 November 1648 and he was buried on 7 November 1648 in the quire of Westminster Abbey as "Thomas Arundell Esq a Member of the House of Commons."

References

Year of birth missing
1648 deaths
Members of the Parliament of England for West Looe
English MPs 1640–1648
Thomas, of Duloe